"Handbags and Gladrags" is a song written in 1967 by Mike d'Abo, who was then the lead singer of Manfred Mann. D'Abo describes the song as "saying to a teenage girl that the way to happiness is not through being trendy. There are deeper values."

The first released version of the song was by Chris Farlowe in 1967, and later interpretations by Rod Stewart (1969) and Stereophonics (2000) were also commercially successful. An arrangement by Big George was the theme for The Office starting in 2001. 

The demo tape of the original version of the song was discovered in 2004 in a closet belonging to bassist Mo Foster. It was amongst a collection of studio recordings d'Abo had recorded in the late 1960s and early 1970s. The collection was eventually released in 2004, on the Angel Air label, under the title Hidden Gems & Treasured Friends.

Chris Farlowe version
In November 1967, singer Chris Farlowe was the first to release a version of the song, produced by Mike d'Abo. It became a #33 hit in the United Kingdom for Immediate Records. This arrangement of the song included Dave Greenslade's piano blues-scale riff. The song was included as track 13 (of 14) on Farlowe's 1969 compilation album The Last Goodbye.

Rod Stewart version

In 1969, Rod Stewart recorded a version for the album An Old Raincoat Won't Ever Let You Down. This version of the song was arranged by Mike d'Abo, who also played piano on the recording. The song failed to garner significant sales or airplay in the United States, but when it was re-released as a single in 1972, it charted on the Billboard Hot 100, peaking at 42 in March. In 1993, Stewart recorded a live version of the song during his session for MTV Unplugged. This version was included on the album Unplugged...and Seated.

Although it was never a hit single for Stewart in the UK, in recognition of its renewed popularity following its use for television series The Office and Stereophonics returning it to the charts, he performed "Handbags and Gladrags" (backed by Phil Collins on drums) as his only song at the Party at the Palace in 2002.

The original record arrangement includes a "plaintive oboe phrasing".

In 1989, Rod Stewart's version of the song was used in the Season One episode of the TV series Midnight Caller entitled "No Exit".

Chase version
In 1971, Bill Chase and his jazz/rock fusion group Chase recorded a version as a single. It was included on their 1971 debut album Chase. It was sung by Ted Piercefield.

Jon English version
In 1973, English-born Australian musician Jon English released his version as his debut single, from his debut studio album Wine Dark Sea.

Stereophonics version

In 2001, Welsh rock band Stereophonics released a version of the song on single. It was subsequently added to their previous album's re-release Just Enough Education to Perform as track seven and on their first compilation album as the final track. The band originally recorded their version as a demo "for a laugh", but after the record company heard it they saw the potential of it being a single and subsequently had it commissioned as one. Despite receiving criticism, it became one of their most successful singles; in Ireland it peaked at number three and was certified gold in the UK.

Release and reception
The song was released as a single on 3 December 2001. Four different releases were made available to the public, this included: two CDs, 7-inch vinyl, and cassette. The first CD released included two more covers, Ewan MacColl's "First Time Ever I Saw Your Face" and John Lennon's "How?". The second CD contained a live version of "Caravan Holiday" and "Nice to be Out", both from Just Enough Education to Perform. The 7-inch vinyl only had "First Time Ever I Saw Your Face" for a B-side, as did the cassette format. A maxi-CD, released in Europe and Australia, includes all five songs but not the live version of "Handbags and Gladrags".

Following on from the "Mr. Writer" critical backlash, the song received a negative review from Drowned in Sound reviewer Anita Bhagwandas. Bhagwandas described it as the "final drop in the Stereophonics' inevitable descent into pop mediocrity" and criticised the group for "selling out."

Track listings

Personnel

Stereophonics
 Kelly Jones – lead vocals, guitar
 Richard Jones – bass guitar
 Stuart Cable – drums

Additional
 Scott James – guitar
 Jools Holland's Rhythm and Blues Orchestra

Technical
 Production – Laurie Latham, Stereophonics
 Engineering – Latham

Charts

Weekly charts

Year-end charts

Certifications

The Office theme song
In 2000, a version of "Handbags and Gladrags" was specifically arranged by Big George as the theme song on the BBC series The Office. Three versions were recorded:

a short, instrumental piece as the opening titles theme
a short, vocal piece as the closing titles theme
an alternative full studio version

Both vocal versions were sung by Waysted vocalist Fin Muir.

In Episode Four of Series One, a version performed by Ricky Gervais (in character as David Brent) was played over the end credits.

Version release history

References

External links
Trilogy Rock: Mike D'Abo Interview (2009)

1967 singles
1970 singles
1972 singles
1973 debut singles
2001 singles
2002 singles
Songs written by Mike d'Abo
Songs based on children's songs
Manfred Mann songs
Rod Stewart songs
Stereophonics songs
Jon English songs
Comedy television theme songs
1967 songs
Immediate Records singles
Mercury Records singles
V2 Records singles
UK Independent Singles Chart number-one singles
Chris Farlowe songs